Mandy Minella and Claudine Schaul were the defending champion but decided not to participate.

Stephanie Vogt and Kathinka von Deichmann won in the final 6–3, 6–3 against Kimberley Cassar and Elena Jetcheva.

Seeds

 Stephanie Vogt / Kathinka von Deichmann (champions)
 Kimberley Cassar / Elena Jetcheva (final)

Draw

References
 Main Draw

Tennis at the 2011 Games of the Small States of Europe